During the 1902–03 English football season, Brentford competed in the Southern League First Division. An appalling season led to a bottom-place finish in the First Division, but the Bees retained their First Division status with a victory over Second Division champions Fulham in a promotion-relegation test match.

Season summary 

After a rude awakening to the Southern League First Division during the previous season and despite having become a professional club in 1900, the Brentford committee continued with an amateur attitude with regards to the running of first team affairs. Despite almost all of the First Division clubs utilising a first team manager, the committee would continue to run first team affairs. Had Brentford been relegated at the end of the previous season, the £557 loss on the season (equivalent to £ in ) would have spelt the end of the club, but attendances had almost doubled at York Road and gate receipts of £1,244 were taken (£ in ). Frustratingly, Brentford's promotion to the First Division had necessitated a trebling of the wage bill, which offset the increased gate receipts. To increase revenue, the club would also enter into the London League and Western League during the season and the squad was expanded to 26 professionals, which led to a 60% expansion of the wage bill. Previous regulars Grieve, Logan, McEleny, McElhaney and captain Stormont all left the club and were replaced by full backs Gilson, Nidd, half backs Green, Newsome and forwards Maher, Pickering, Turner and Underwood.

Brentford began the First Division season in even worse form than it had the last, losing the first 9 matches. Bristol City trainer Bob Crone was brought in to replace Tom King and while the team's fitness improved, its form did not. The FA Cup provided a welcome distraction and the team's form belied that of in the league, scoring 16 goals in six matches to advance from the third qualifying round to the intermediate round and a matchup with Football League First Division club Woolwich Arsenal. The Bees took the Gunners to a replay at the Manor Ground, but the run ended with a 5–0 defeat. While the cup exploits had inspired Brentford to a first league victory of the season on 22 November 1902, it had raised the profile of forward Tommy Shanks, who had scored in 9 goals in a 10-match spell through November and December 1902.

1903 began with the shock transfer of Tommy Shanks to Woolwich Arsenal, with Brentford receiving £200 and forward Joe Connor, who on 21 March 1903 would become Brentford's first international player when he played and scored for Ireland in a 2–0 victory over Scotland. The Bees took just 3 points from a possible 34 during the rest of the season and finished bottom of the First Division, which led to a promotion-relegation test match versus Second Division champions Fulham on 28 April. The team put in its best performance of the season to run out 7–2 victors, with Joe Connor scoring four goals.

Statistically, 1902–03 was Brentford's worst Southern League season, winning just twice and drawing once. A number of club records were set or equalled during the season:
 Most Southern League home defeats in a season: 12
 Most Southern League away defeats in a season: 0
 Least Southern League wins in a season: 2
 Least Southern League home wins in a season: 2
 Least Southern League away wins in a season: 0
 Least Southern League draws in a season: 1
 Least Southern League home draws in a season: 1
 Least Southern League away draws in a season: 0
 Most FA Cup goals in a season: 8 – Tommy Shanks

League table

Results
Brentford's goal tally listed first.

Legend

Southern League First Division

Southern League Test Match

FA Cup

 Source: 100 Years of Brentford

Playing squad

Left club during season

 Source: 100 Years of Brentford, The Football Association

Coaching staff

Statistics

Appearances

Goalscorers 

Players listed in italics left the club mid-season.
Source: 100 Years Of Brentford

International caps

Management

Summary

Notes

References 

Brentford F.C. seasons
Brentford